Clement John Koshorek (June 20, 1925 – September 8, 1991) was an American professional baseball player who had a 14-season career, mostly in the minor leagues. The infielder appeared in 99 games in Major League Baseball for the – Pittsburgh Pirates. Born in Royal Oak, Michigan, Koshorek threw and batted right-handed.

Detroit Tigers prospect

Koshorek's minor league career began in the farm system of the Detroit Tigers in 1946. As the shortstop for the Flint Arrows in the higher-level Central League from 1948 to 1950, he was nicknamed "Scooter". Koshorek was considered a good prospect, but he briefly quit the game after he was turned down for a raise in pay by Tigers farm director Red Rolfe. Koshorek was eventually reinstated by the Tigers, playing for the Charleston Rebels of the Sally League, then the Little Rock Travelers of the Double-A Southern Association. He was selected by the Pirates in the 1951 Rule 5 draft.

Pittsburgh Pirates infielder
Koshorek was a member of the Pirates' MLB roster for the entire 1952 season. Appearing in 98 games, he stated 33 games at shortstop, 25 at third base and 24 at second base, and batted .261 with 84 hits, including 17 doubles. He drove in 15 runs. But the 1952 Pirates won only 42 of 154 games, the franchise's worst record in the post-1900 era. Koshorek appeared in only one contest in 1953, as a pinch hitter April 14, when he struck out against Joe Black of the Brooklyn Dodgers. He was sent to the minors, where he played for almost seven full seasons, including one (1959) as player–manager of the Palatka Redlegs, a Cincinnati farm team.

An article in the June 1958 issue of Baseball Digest includes the 5'4" Koshorek with other smaller infielders like Rabbit Maranville, Sparky Adams, Phil Rizzuto and Skeeter Scalzi. These players, the writer noted, had to do more to impress baseball scouts.

References

External links

 

1925 births
1991 deaths
Asheville Tourists players
Baseball players from Michigan
Beaumont Exporters players
Charleston Rebels players
Flint Arrows players
Hollywood Stars players
Indianapolis Indians players
Jamestown Falcons players
Little Rock Travelers players
Major League Baseball infielders
Memphis Chickasaws players
Minor league baseball managers
Minor league baseball players
Montgomery Rebels players
New Orleans Pelicans (baseball) players
Palatka Redlegs players
Pittsburgh Pirates players
Savannah Reds players
Sportspeople from Royal Oak, Michigan
Topeka Hawks players
Toronto Maple Leafs (International League) players
Williamsport Tigers players
American expatriate baseball players in Venezuela